The Americas Zone was one of the three zones of the regional Davis Cup competition in 1996.

In the Americas Zone there were three different tiers, called groups, in which teams competed against each other to advance to the upper tier.

Group I

Winners in Group I advanced to the World Group Qualifying Round, along with losing teams from the World Group first round. Teams who lost their respective ties competed in the relegation play-offs, with winning teams remaining in Group I, whereas teams who lost their play-offs were relegated to the Americas Zone Group II in 1997.

Participating nations

Draw

Group II

Winners in Group II advanced to the Americas Zone Group I. Teams who lost their respective ties competed in the relegation play-offs, with winning teams remaining in Group II, whereas teams who lost their play-offs were relegated to the Americas Zone Group III in 1997.

Participating nations

Draw

Group III

Winners in Group III advanced to the Americas Zone Group II in 1997. In a move to a four-tier system, the bottom three teams were re-assigned to the new Group IV in 1997; all other teams remained in Group III.

Participating nations

Draw

References

External links
Davis Cup official website

 
Davis Cup Americas Zone
Americas Zone